A Pox on the Pioneers is the debut solo studio album by Andrew Weatherall. It was released through Rotters Golf Club on 21 September 2009.

Critical reception

David Pollock of The List wrote, "With Weatherall himself singing as if from the heart of a smoke-filled room (and perhaps he was), the album explores dancehall, ambient dub, electro and post-punk in building an atmospheric soundtrack for the city at night." Iain Moffat of The Quietus called it "the most song-based work of his career." Meanwhile, Louise Brailey of Fact commented that "A Pox on the Pioneers is an idiosyncratic and surprising debut at best – I expected something more."

Clash placed it at number 9 on the "Top 40 Albums of 2009" list.

Track listing

Personnel
Credits adapted from liner notes.

 Andrew Weatherall – vocals, keyboards, drums, percussion
 Steve Boardman – programming, keyboards, drums, percussion
 Chris Mackin – guitar, bass guitar, backing vocals
 Tim Fairplay – guitar, bass guitar
 Chris Harris – guitar
 Keith Tenniswood – guitar (9)
 Bobby Gillespie – backing vocals
 Sophie Braithewaite – backing vocals
 Luke Mclean – artwork

References

Further reading

External links
 

2009 debut albums
Andrew Weatherall albums